Liverpool Plains was an electoral district of the Legislative Assembly in the Australian state of New South Wales, created in 1859 and including the Liverpool Plains (which includes Quirindi and Gunnedah) and the extensive pastoral district around the Gwydir River in the northwest of the state. It was created when the seat of Liverpool Plains and Gwydir was divided into two. It was abolished in 1880, and partly replaced by Gunnedah. It was re-created in the 1904 re-distribution of electorates following the 1903 New South Wales referendum, which required the number of members of the Legislative Assembly to be reduced from 125 to 90. It consisted of parts of the abolished seats of Gunnedah, Quirindi, and Wellington. In 1920, with the introduction of proportional representation it was absorbed into Wammerawa, along with Castlereagh and Mudgee. Liverpool Plains was recreated for the 1927 election and finally abolished in 1962. The district was divided between Barwon and Upper Hunter. The sitting member, Frank O'Keefe, successfully contested Upper Hunter at the 1962 election.

Members for Liverpool Plains

Election results

References

Former electoral districts of New South Wales
Constituencies established in 1859
1859 establishments in Australia
Constituencies disestablished in 1880
1880 disestablishments in Australia
Constituencies established in 1904
1904 establishments in Australia
Constituencies disestablished in 1920
1920 disestablishments in Australia
Constituencies established in 1927
1927 establishments in Australia
Constituencies disestablished in 1962
1962 disestablishments in Australia